is a Japanese seinen manga magazine published by Shogakukan, aimed at an older adult and mostly male audience. It is a sister magazine to Big Comic, the biggest difference being that it goes on sale twice a month in the weeks Big Comic does not. Cover artwork usually features a dog or cat, and a haiku. The dozen or so manga serials running at any given time feature a wide variety of material, from historical dramas and suspense to sports and romance, with relatively little science fiction or fantasy.

Launched in 1972, it has published over 1000 issues, typically running to about 350 pages in a black-and-white, saddle-stapled format, selling for 340 yen (2015). More than 83% of readers are reported to be over 30 years old, with female readers comprising about a quarter of the total. Most readers are company employees. Circulation in 2015 was reported at 539,500.

Currently running manga series

Manga artists and series published
 Mitsuru Adachi 
 Jinbē (1992–1997) and Bōken Shōnen (1998–2005)
 George Akiyama
 Haguregumo (1973–2017)
 Nobuyuki Fukumoto  
 The Legend of the Strongest, Kurosawa! (2002–2006)
 Shin Kurosawa:Saikyō Densetsu (2013–2020)
 Mitsuo Hashimoto  
 Station (1992–1996)
 Kenshi Hirokane and Masao Yajima
 Human Crossing (1980–1990)
 Shin'ichi Ishizuka
 Gaku: Minna no Yama (2003–2012)
 Hideo Iura
 Bengoshi no Kuzu (2003–2009)
 Ichimaru
 Okami-san (1990–1999)
 Okami-san Heisei Basho (2011–2013)
 Junji Ito
 No Longer Human (2017–2018)
 Eiji Kazama
  (1990–2022; with Nobuhiro Sakata)
 Kō Kojima
 Hige to Boin (1974–2004)
 Shinji Mizushima
 Abu-san (1973–2014)
 Motoka Murakami
 Ryuu  Ron (1991–2006)
 Jiro Taniguchi
 Guardians of the Louvre (2014)
 Naoki Urasawa
 Pineapple Army (1985–1988; with Kazuya Kudo)
 Master Keaton (1988–1994; with Hokusei Katsushika and Takashi Nagasaki)
 Monster (1994–2001)
 Pluto (2003–2009)
 Master Keaton Remaster (2012–2014; with Takashi Nagasaki)
 Mujirushi: The Sign of Dreams (2017–2018)
 Takatoshi Yamada
 Dr. Kotō Shinryōjo (moved from Weekly Young Sunday; 2008–2010) [on hiatus]
 Osamu Yamamoto
 Akagari: The Red Rat in Hollywood (2017–2021)

Notes

References

External links
  
 

1972 establishments in Japan
Magazines established in 1972
Magazines published in Tokyo
Semimonthly manga magazines published in Japan
Seinen manga magazines
Shogakukan magazines